Tamara Haggerty (born 29 April 1996) is a Dutch handball player who plays for HH Elite and the Dutch national team.

She made her debut on the Dutch national team on 31 May 2019, against Russia.

She was selected as part of the Dutch 35-player squad for the 2021 World Women's Handball Championship.

Achievements 
Swedish Championship:
Gold Medalist: 2022
Handball-Bundesliga Frauen:
Bronze Medalist: 2019, 2021
DHB-Pokal:
Bronze Medalist: 2019
NHV Eredivisie Dames:
Silver Medalist: 2013

References

1996 births
Living people
Dutch female handball players
Sportspeople from Haarlem
Expatriate handball players
Dutch expatriate sportspeople in Germany
Dutch expatriate sportspeople in Sweden
Dutch expatriate sportspeople in Denmark
21st-century Dutch women